Lance Morrow (born September 21, 1939, Philadelphia, Pennsylvania) is an American essayist and writer, chiefly for Time magazine, as well as the author of several books. He won the 1981 National Magazine Award for Essay and Criticism and was a finalist for the same award in 1991. He has the distinction of writing more "Man of the Year" articles than any other writer in the magazine's history and has appeared on The Late Late Show with Craig Ferguson and The O'Reilly Factor. He is a former professor of journalism and University Professor at Boston University.

Background
Lance Morrow was born on September 21, 1939, and was raised in Washington D.C., where he attended Gonzaga College High School. His father, Hugh Morrow, was for many years a chief aide to New York Governor and later Vice President Nelson Rockefeller.
Morrow graduated magna cum laude from Harvard University in 1963 with a BA in English literature.

Career

Morrow joined Time in 1965 after a brief stint with the now-defunct Washington Star. As a reporter, he covered the 1967 Detroit race riots, the Vietnam War, the Nixon administration and the Watergate scandal. He also has penned several of Time'''s "Man of the Year" articles.
In 1976, Morrow became a regular writer of Time's backpage essay. He won the National Magazine Award for his essays in Time in 1981, was a finalist for the award in 1991 (for an essay cover on the subject of evil), and was among the Time writers who won the award in 2001, for their coverage of September 11 (in a special issue that closed on the afternoon of the September 11 attacks. Morrow contributed the essay for that issue).  In his award winning September 11 essay, "The Case for Rage and Retribution" he wrote:   A day cannot live in infamy without the nourishment of rage. Let's have rage... Let America explore the rich reciprocal possibilities of the fatwa. A policy of focused brutality does not come easily to a self-conscious, self-indulgent, contradictory, diverse, humane nation with a short attention span. America needs to relearn a lost discipline, self-confident relentlessness and to relearn why human nature has equipped us all with a weapon (abhorred in decent peacetime societies) called hatred... This is the moment of clarity. Let the civilized toughen up, and let the uncivilized take their chances in the game they started."     Morrow was a University Professor at Boston University from 1996 to 2006,  when he was asked to write the authorized biography of Henry Luce, the founder of Time magazine.

In 2018, he began contributing to City Journal magazine.

Personal life
Morrow  lives in Chatham, New York, with his wife Susan Brind Morrow, who is also an author. He has two sons, Justin, a writer and filmmaker, and James, a political consultant and journalist in Sydney, Australia. 

Morrow’s cousin is the science fiction writer James K. Morrow.

BibliographyThe Chief: A Memoir of Fathers and Sons (1985)Fishing in the Tiber: Essays (1988)America: A Rediscovery (1989)Heart: A Memoir (1995)Evil: An Investigation (2003)The Best Year of Their Lives: Kennedy, Nixon, and Johnson in 1948: Learning the Secrets of Power (2005)Second Drafts of History: Essays (2006)God and Mammon: Chronicles of American Money (2020)The Noise of Typewriters: Remembering Journalism'' (2023)

References

External links
 PBS Here & Now 9/17/2003 episode (audio) discusses Morrow's book Evil: An Investigation

American male journalists
Boston University faculty
Harvard University alumni
1939 births
Living people
Gonzaga College High School alumni
Writers from Philadelphia
Ethics and Public Policy Center